Udumbara is a 2018 Sri Lankan Sinhalese sports drama film directed by K.S Chammanthraj and produced by MTV Channel as a Sirasa Movie. It stars Jackson Anthony Harshi Rasanga and a newcomer Nadeeshani in lead roles along with Sarath Kothalawala and Janaka Kumbukage. Music composed by Dhina. Member of Parliament Hon. Hirunika Premachandra made her acting debut. It is the 1314th Sri Lankan film in the Sinhalese cinema.

Plot
Ananda, a sports coach in a rural village school, has become addicted to alcohol due to losing both his wife and his only son in a car accident. He then discovers a running prodigy named Udumbara in the local village school. Becoming interested in Udumbara's talent, Ananda successfully gives up drinking and sets about developing Udumbara's talent. Meanwhile, the court case against the driver of the car which killed Ananda's wife and son progresses, and the accused's sister meets Udumbara. The sister of the accused, known in the story as Mrs. Shanika, turns out to be a coach of some renown, and she, alongside Ananda, train Udumbara. Under their tutelage, Udumbara ends up winning the national championship. The story then progresses to Udumbara's victory in the international stage.

Cast
 Jackson Anthony as Ananda
 Nadeeshani Henderson as Udumbara
 Harshi Rasanga as Young Udumbara
 Sarath Kothalawala as Udumabara's father
 Jayani Senanayake as Udumbara's mother
 Janaka Kumbukage as Ananda's friend
 Hirunika Premachandra as Udumabara's national coach
 Sangeetha Basnayake as Ananda's wife
 Kaushalya Nirmana as Sachin, Ananda's son
 Michelle Dilhara as Michelle
 Upatissa Balasuriya as Lawyer Jinadasa
 Ryan van Rooyen

Soundtrack
The film consists of two songs.

Accolades

References

External links
 

2018 films